The Sunfish-class destroyers, also referred to as ''Opossum''-class destroyers, was a group of three torpedo boat destroyers which served with the Royal Navy from the 1890s to the 1920s. They were all built by the Hebburn-on-Tyne shipyard of Hawthorn Leslie.

Design 
As was typical for torpedo craft at the time, the Admiralty left detailed design to the builders, laying down only broad requirements.

The ships produced  and could make . They were armed with one twelve pounder gun and two torpedo tubes and carried a complement of 53 officers and men.

History 
Ordered under the 1893-94 Programme, the contract was placed on 7 February 1894. All three "turtle-back" destroyers were laid down in 1894, launched in 1895 and completed in 1896.

In September 1913 all three, like the other surviving 27-knotter destroyers, were re-classed as A Class destroyers.

They served in Home waters throughout the First World War, and all three were sold for breaking up in 1920.

Ships in class

See also
A-class destroyer (1913)

References

Notes

Bibliography

 

Destroyer classes
Ship classes of the Royal Navy